Bembéréké Airport , also spelled as Bembèrèkè Airport, is a public use airport located 4 km northeast of Bembéréké, Borgou, Benin.

References

External links 
 Airport record for Bembéréké Airport at Landings.com

Airports in Benin
Borgou Department